Diāng-biĕng-gù (Foochow Romanized: diāng-biĕng-gù), also known as guo bian hu and ding bian cuo, is a characteristic dish of Fuzhou cuisine, a branch of Fujian cuisine, consisting of a rice flour batter poured around the side of cooking wok to form a thin noodle, then scraped into a stock to simmer and served in broth. Other ingredients to flavour the stock are often served in the broth; commonly included is a form of seafood, some meat (such as meatballs, usually pork) and various vegetables.

Besides Fujian, it is also popular in Taiwan. In Taiwanese Hokkien, it is known as tiánn-pinn-sô (in the Taiwanese Romanization System), and has been served to foreign dignitaries at state banquets. During Ming and Qing Dynasty, diāng-biĕng-gù was introduced to Longyou and Jinhua in central Zhejiang by traders, called hu in Longyou and Fujian geng in Jinhua. However, the ingredients were changed due to the lack of access to seafood.

References 

Chinese cuisine
Fujian cuisine